Novotroitsk is a rural locality (a village) in Michurinsky Selsoviet, Sharansky District, Bashkortostan, Russia. The population was 17 as of 2010. There is 1 street.

Geography 
Novotroitsk is located 27 km northeast of Sharan (the district's administrative centre) by road. Grigoryevka is the nearest rural locality.

References 

Rural localities in Sharansky District